Lazaros "Lazo" Agadakos (born January 1, 1980) is a Greek professional basketball player. At a height of 2.08 m (6'10") tall, he played at the power forward and center positions.

Professional career
After playing in the Greek minors with Ilioupolis, in the 1997–98 season, Agadakos started his professional career playing with Palaio Faliro, in the Greek 2nd Division, in the 1998–99 season. He then spent 4 seasons with the Greek 1st Division club Panionios, and then spent a year with Maroussi. In 2004, he joined the Greek club Olympiacos, and he played there for two years in the EuroLeague. He then moved to PAOK for one year, and he later joined Aris.

National team career
Agadakos won bronze medals at the 1995 FIBA Europe Under-16 Championship, and the 1998 FIBA Europe Under-18 Championship.

References

External links 
FIBA Archive Profile
FIBA Europe Profile
Euroleague.net Profile
Eurobasket.com Profile
Basket.gr Profile 
Draftexpress.com Profile

1980 births
Living people
Aris B.C. players
Centers (basketball)
EFAO Zografou B.C. players
Greek men's basketball players
Ikaros B.C. players
Ilioupolis B.C. players
Koropi B.C. players
Maroussi B.C. players
Olympiacos B.C. players
Palaio Faliro B.C. players
Panionios B.C. players
P.A.O.K. BC players
Peristeri B.C. players
Power forwards (basketball)
Basketball players from Athens